The Chacabuco River is a river of Chile located in the Aysén del General Carlos Ibáñez del Campo Region. The river rises in a col between Cerro Lucas Bridges and Cerro Baker. The latter is a mountain on the Argentina-Chile border, close to Roballos Pass.

Patagonia Park occupies the most of Chacabuco River Basin. There is a project to create a national park, which will comprise the lands of Patagonia Park, Lago Cochrane National Reserve and Lago Jeinimeni National Reserve.

See also
List of rivers of Chile

References

Rivers of Chile
Rivers of Aysén Region